Manny Pacquiao vs. Óscar Larios, also billed as Mano-A-Mano, was a professional boxing super featherweight fight held on July 2, 2006, at the Araneta Coliseum, Quezon City, in the Philippines and was a production of ABS-CBN Sports and promoted by Manny Pacquiao Promotions and Golden Boy Promotions. The judges were Humbert Furgoni from France, Daniel van de Wiele from Belgium, and Noppharat Srichharoen from Thailand with referee Bruce McTavish and ring announcer Michael Buffer. It was aired live in free-to-air television network ABS-CBN, worldwide through The Filipino Channel, and through pay per view on In Demand, HBO, DirecTV, and  SkyCable. Pacquiao won the fight via unanimous decision, knocking down Larios two times. The three judges scored the fight 117–110, 118–108 and 120–106 all for Pacquiao.

On July 3, 2006, the day after winning the fight against Larios, President Gloria Macapagal Arroyo personally bestowed the Order of Lakandula with the rank of "Champion for Life" (Kampeon Habambuhay) and the plaque of appreciation to Pacquiao in a simple ceremony at the Presidential Study of Malacañang Palace.

Reception
Many people criticized the bout for its expensive tickets. A few days before the fight, more than half of the seats were not sold. Because of this, ABS-CBN gave away millions worth of tickets for free and offered the remaining tickets directly to Filipino celebrities, politicians, and businessmen. In the end, the tickets were sold out with an earning of 96.2 million pesos. The fight sold 120,000 pay per view (PPV) in the United States generating a total of US$4.79 million.

The bout is currently the 17th most watched television broadcasts in the Philippines with a rating of 54.4% based on the data of AGB Nielsen Philippines.

References

Larios
2006 in boxing
Boxing in the Philippines
Boxing in Asia
July 2006 sports events in Asia
ABS-CBN television specials